Brother's Blood is the fifth studio album by American indie rock musician Kevin Devine, his first album since 2006 and first release on the Favorite Gentlemen record label.

Background
Throughout the course of 2008, Devine premiered a number of demos via his MySpace page and began adding new songs to his live set. The album was recorded in Summer 2008 at Headgear Studios in Brooklyn, New York

In an interview in June 2009, Devine listed the topics of the album as "The end of days, a dead dog and his sailor master, hallucinogenic fever dreams, sexual infatuation, vividly imagined infidelity, Irish women, Irish Spring, baby boomers, cold feet, getting responsible, life on life's terms."

Promotion and release
During his November/December 2008 tour with Manchester Orchestra, the I Could Be With Anyone EP was released, featuring two b-sides, a demo and the title track which would be later released on Brother's Blood.

The album was leaked in February 2009, two months before its official release. The leak was so premature that the album's artwork had not yet been finalized. On March 2, 2009, Kevin addressed the leak via his MySpace blog.

Devine's first headlining tour was announced in March 2009, the Brother's Blood tour, which ran from April 24 to June 7, 2009. He was supported by Brian Bonz & The Dot Hongs, Miniature Tigers and Sarah Jaffe.

On March 25, 2009, the EPK for Brother's Blood was released via Devine's MySpace.

On June 5, 2009 the video for "I Could Be with Anyone" premiered on Spinner.com, featuring "a series of couples both real and staged in various stages of their relationships." It was directed by Sherng-Lee Huang.

Academy Fight Song (US) and Arctic Rodeo Recordings (Europe) released a limited edition 2xLP for the album in November on colored vinyl, with a laser etched fourth side. The CD version of the album released by Arctic Rodeo features a bonus track, "She Stayed as Steam", as track 11. This track, along with another unreleased track, "Big Bad Man", features on the She Stayed As Steam EP.

Track listing

B-Sides
The I Could Be with Anyone E.P. features 2 b-sides, "The Weather Is Wonderful" and "What's Keeping Us Young", along with a demo for "She Stayed As Steam".

The She Stayed As Steam EP features 2 b-sides, "She Stayed As Steam" and "Big Bad Man", along with 2 remixes,"Breathe, Breathe Deep ("Hand Of God" RMX By Plosive)" and "Another Bag of Bones (Devastation Of Death RMX By Trevor Dowdy)". "She Stayed As Steam" also features as a bonus track on the German version of the album.

Full band demos of "Yr Husband" and "Big Bad Man" feature as bonus downloads with UK version of the album.

References

Kevin Devine albums
2009 albums